Prince Leopold, Duke of Albany,  (Leopold George Duncan Albert; 7 April 185328 March 1884) was the eighth child and youngest son of Queen Victoria and Prince Albert. Leopold was later created Duke of Albany, Earl of Clarence, and Baron Arklow. He had haemophilia, which contributed to his death following a fall at the age of 30.

Early life

Leopold was born on 7 April 1853 at Buckingham Palace, London, the eighth child and youngest son of Queen Victoria of the United Kingdom and Prince Albert of Saxe-Coburg and Gotha. During labour, Queen Victoria chose to use chloroform and thereby encouraged the use of anesthesia in childbirth, recently developed by Professor James Young Simpson. The chloroform was administered by John Snow. As a son of the British sovereign, the newborn was styled His Royal Highness The Prince Leopold at birth. His parents named him Leopold after their common uncle, King Leopold I of Belgium.

He was baptised in the Private Chapel of Buckingham Palace on 28 June 1853 by the Archbishop of Canterbury, John Bird Sumner. His godparents were his first cousin once removed, King George V of Hanover; his fourth cousin once removed, Princess William of Prussia; his first cousin once removed, Princess Mary Adelaide of Cambridge; and his maternal uncle by marriage, Prince Ernst of Hohenlohe-Langenburg.

Leopold inherited the disease haemophilia from his mother, Queen Victoria, and was a delicate child.  There was speculation during his life that Leopold also had mild epilepsy, like his great-nephew Prince John.

Education and career
The Prince's intellectual abilities were evident as a boy; Poet Laureate, Alfred, Lord Tennyson and his friend, philosopher James Martineau, were familiar with the Queen's children and had noted that Leopold, who had often "conversed with the eminent Dr. Martineau, was considered to be a young man of a very thoughtful mind, high aims, and quite remarkable acquirements". His daughter, Princess Alice, wrote in her memoirs that his "literary and artistic inclinations were encouraged and developed by his beloved tutor, Robert Collins". He was also tutored by Canon Duckworth and for two years before that, by a young Eton master called Mr. Shuldam.

Oxford University
In 1872, Prince Leopold entered Christ Church, Oxford, where he studied a variety of subjects and became president of the Oxford University Chess Club. On coming of age in 1874, he was made a privy councillor and granted an annuity of £15,000. He left the university in 1876 with an honorary doctorate in civil law (DCL), and then travelled in Europe. In 1880, he toured Canada and the United States with his sister, Princess Louise, whose husband John Campbell, Marquess of Lorne, was Governor General of Canada. Leopold was a prominent patron of chess, and the London 1883 chess tournament was held under his patronage. Incapable of pursuing a military career because of his haemophilia and the need to avoid even minor injuries, Leopold instead became a patron of the arts and literature and served as an unofficial secretary to his mother. "Leopold was the favourite son, and through him her relations with the Government of the day were usually kept up." Later he pursued vice-regal appointments in Canada and the Colony of Victoria, but his mother refused to appoint him, to his great unhappiness.

British Army
Despite his inability to pursue an active military role, he had an honorary association with the 72nd Regiment, Duke of Albany's Own Highlanders, and from 1881 served as the first Colonel-in-Chief of the Seaforth Highlanders, when that regiment was formed through the merger of the 72nd regiment with the 78th (Highlanders) Regiment of Foot. A portrait of Prince Leopold in military uniform is held in the Royal Collection. The Seaforth Highlanders paraded at Prince Leopold's funeral, a fact recorded by William McGonagall in his poem "The Death of Prince Leopold".

Freemasonry
Prince Leopold was an active Freemason, being initiated in the Apollo University Lodge, Oxford, whilst resident at Christ Church. He was proposed for membership by his brother, Albert Edward, Prince of Wales, who was at the time the Worshipful Master of the Lodge, and was initiated in a joint ceremony with Robert Hawthorne Collins, his friend and tutor, who later became Comptroller of his Household. He served as Master of the Lodge from 1876 to 1877, and was later the Provincial Grand Master for Oxfordshire, still holding that office at the time of his death. In 1882 he laid the foundation stone of the Masonic Hall on Marlborough Street in Banbury.

Marriage

Prince Leopold, stifled by the desire of Queen Victoria to keep him at home, saw marriage as his only hope of independence. Due to his haemophilia, he had difficulty finding a wife. He was acquainted with Alice Liddell, the daughter of the Vice-Chancellor of Oxford for whom Lewis Carroll wrote Alice's Adventures in Wonderland, and was godfather of Alice's second son, who was named after him. It has been suggested that he considered marrying her, though others suggest that he preferred her sister Edith (for whom he later served as pall-bearer on 30 June 1876).

Leopold also considered his second cousin Princess Frederica of Hanover as a bride; they instead became lifelong friends and confidantes. Other royal and aristocratic women he pursued included heiress Daisy Maynard, Princess Elisabeth of Hesse-Kassel, Princess Karoline Mathilde of Schleswig-Holstein-Sonderburg-Augustenburg, Princess Stéphanie of Belgium and Princess Victoria of Baden. Leopold was very fond of Mary Baring, daughter of Lord Ashburton, but though she was equally fond of him, at 19, she felt she was too young to marry.

After rejection from these women, Victoria stepped in to bar what she saw as unsuitable possibilities. Insisting that the children of British monarchs should marry into other reigning Protestant families, Victoria suggested a meeting with Princess Helen Frederica, the daughter of George Victor, reigning Prince of Waldeck-Pyrmont, one of whose daughters had already married King William III of the Netherlands. On 27 April 1882, Leopold and Helen were married at St George's Chapel at Windsor Castle, and his income was raised by parliament to £25,000. They enjoyed a happy, albeit brief marriage. In 1883, Leopold became a father when his wife gave birth to a daughter, Alice. However, he did not live to see the birth of his son, Charles Edward.

Illness and death
Prince Leopold had haemophilia diagnosed in childhood, and in early years had various physicians in permanent attendance, including Arnold Royle and John Wickham Legg. In February 1884, Leopold went to Cannes on doctor's orders: joint pain is a common symptom of haemophilia and the winter climate in the United Kingdom was always difficult for him. His wife, pregnant at the time, stayed at home but urged him to go. On 27 March, at his Cannes residence, the 'Villa Nevada', he slipped and fell, injuring his knee and hitting his head. He died in the early hours of the next morning, apparently from a cerebral haemorrhage. His remains were interred in the Royal Vault and later buried in the Albert Memorial Chapel at Windsor. The court observed official mourning from 30 March 1884 to 11 May 1884.

Having died six years after his older sister Alice, Leopold was the second, but the youngest of Queen Victoria's children to die, being only 30 years old at the time of his death.  His mother outlived him by seventeen years, by which time she had also outlived a third child, Alfred. Leopold's passing was lamented by the Scottish "poet and tragedian" William McGonagall in the poem "The Death of Prince Leopold". Queen Victoria wrote in her journal:
 		
Another awful blow has fallen upon me & all of us today. My beloved Leopold, that bright, clever son, who had so many times recovered from such fearful illness, & from various small accidents, has been taken from us! To lose another dear child, far from me, & one who was so gifted, & such a help to me, is too dreadful!

The haemophilia gene is carried on the X chromosome, and is normally passed through female descent, as in the past few haemophiliac men survived to beget children. Any daughter of a haemophiliac is a carrier of the gene.  Leopold's daughter Alice inherited the haemophilia gene, and passed it to her elder son Rupert.

Leopold's posthumous son, Prince Charles Edward, succeeded him as 2nd Duke of Albany upon birth four months later.  Charles Edward succeeded his uncle Alfred as Duke of Saxe-Coburg and Gotha in 1900.  Through Charles Edward, Leopold is the great-grandfather of Carl XVI Gustaf, the current King of Sweden.

Titles, styles, honours and arms

Titles
7 April 185324 May 1881: His Royal Highness The Prince Leopold
24 May 188128 March 1884: His Royal Highness The Duke of Albany

Prince Leopold was created Duke of Albany, Earl of Clarence and Baron Arklow on 24 May 1881.

Honours
British decorations
 Royal Knight of the Garter, 29 April 1869
 Knight of the Thistle, 24 May 1871
 Member of the Privy Council of the United Kingdom, 20 October 1874
 Knight Grand Commander of the Star of India, 25 January 1877
 Bailiff Grand Cross of St. John of Jerusalem, 1880
 Knight Grand Cross of St Michael and St George, 24 May 1880

Foreign decorations

Arms
In 1856, at the age of three, Prince Leopold was granted a personal coat of arms – the arms of the kingdom, with an inescutcheon of the shield of Saxony (representing his father), and all differenced by a label argent of three points, the first and third bearing hearts gules, and the second a cross gules.

Honorary degrees 
On 30 January 1884, the University of Durham conferred the honorary degree of Doctor of Civil Law (DCL) upon Prince Leopold. The ceremony, held in Durham Cathedral Library, attracted many spectators. He later wrote to the university expressing a wish to become a member of University College.

Issue

Ancestors

References

External links

 

1853 births
1884 deaths
19th-century British people
British princes
Alumni of Christ Church, Oxford
Albany, Prince Leopold, Duke of
Albany, Prince Leopold, Duke of
Burials at St George's Chapel, Windsor Castle
Chess patrons
Dukes of Albany
 Leopold
Freemasons of the United Grand Lodge of England
Haemophilia in European royalty
House of Saxe-Coburg and Gotha (United Kingdom)
People from Westminster
Princes of the United Kingdom
Albany, Leopold, Duke of
Albany, Leopold, Duke of
Albany, Prince Leopold, Duke of
Albany, Prince Leopold, Duke of
Recipients of the Order of the Netherlands Lion
Members of the Privy Council of the United Kingdom
Presidents of the Royal Society of Literature
Children of Queen Victoria
Deaths from cerebrovascular disease
Accidental deaths from falls
Sons of monarchs